The Government of Andhra Pradesh, abbreviated as, GOAP, or, Andhra Government, is the subnational government for the Indian state of Andhra Pradesh. It is an elected government with 175 MLAs elected to the Legislative Assembly of Andhra Pradesh for a five-year term. The Government of Andhra Pradesh is a democratically elected body that governs the state of Andhra Pradesh, India. The state government is headed by the governor of Andhra Pradesh as the nominal head of state, with a democratically elected chief minister as the real head of the executive. The governor who is appointed for five years appoints the chief minister and his Council of Ministers. Even though the governor remains the ceremonial head of the state, the day-to-day running of the government is taken care of by the chief minister and his Council of Ministers in whom a great deal of legislative powers is vested.

Governance

Executive

The Government of Andhra Pradesh is a democratically elected body with the governor as the constitutional head. The governor who is appointed for a period of five years appoints the chief minister and his council of ministers. Even though the governor remains the ceremonial head of the state, the day-to-day running of the government is taken care of by the chief minister and his council of ministers in whom a great deal of legislative powers is vested.

Legislature

The Andhra Pradesh Legislature is currently bicameral consisting of:
 Legislative Assembly: 175 members (MLAs)
 Legislative Council: 58 members (MLCs)

Judiciary

High Court of Judicature at Hyderabad was the highest court of appeal at the state level till 2019. After Andhra Pradesh High Court was inaugurated in Amaravati on 1 January 2019, it became the High Court for the State of Andhra Pradesh. It has subordinate Civil and Criminal Courts in every District. Decisions of the High Court of Andhra Pradesh can be appealed in the Supreme Court of India.

See also
 List of Chief Ministers of Andhra Pradesh
 Politics of Andhra Pradesh

References

External links 
 Andhra Pradesh State Website 
 NIC, Andhra Pradesh